Nomadik is a family of microprocessors for multimedia applications from STMicroelectronics. It is based on ARM9 ARM architecture and was designed specifically for mobile devices.

On December 12, 2002, STMicroelectronics and Texas Instruments jointly announced an initiative for Open Mobile Application Processor Interfaces (OMAPI) intended to be used with 2.5 and 3G mobile phones, that were going to be produced during 2003. (This was later merged into a larger initiative and renamed the MIPI alliance.) The Nomadik was STMicroelectronics' implementation of this standard.
Nomadik was first presented on October 7, 2003 in the CEATEC show in Tokyo, and later that year the Nomadik won the Microprocessor Report Analysts' Choice Award for application processors.

The family was aimed at 2.5G/3G mobile phones, personal digital assistants and other portable wireless products with multimedia capability. In addition it was suitable for automotive multimedia applications. The most known device using the Nomadik processor was the Nokia N96 which used the STn8815 version of the chip. When the N96 debuted in 2008, the absence of a GPU was noticed.

Processor family 
 STn8800 (first version), presented in 2003. was based on ARM926EJ-S had a 350Mhz CPU core.
 STn8810 Based on ARM926EJ-S, released in 2005 according to PDAdb.net this processor was used in Samsung Telecommunications GT-C6625, GT-C6620, SGH-i200 (all running Windows Mobile 6.1) and LG Electronics LG KS10 (running Symbian). It was manufactured in 130 nanometer silicon process and supported  VGA type graphics and 2-4 megapixel cameras.
 STn8811 Based on ARM926EJ-S, released in 2007
 STn8815 Based on ARM926EJ-S, released in 2008 with 16KiB data and instruction caches and 128KiB level 2 cache, clocked at 334 MHz. This SoC was used in Nokia 6788 and N96, as well as in Samsung SGH-L870. It was manufactured in 90 nanometer silicon technology.
 STn8820 Based on ARM11, released in 2008 with 32KiB data and instruction caches and 256KiB level 2 cache, clocked at 528 MHz. It was manufactured in 65 nanometer silicon technology.
 STn8830 was evidently planned for 45 nanometer silicon technology but appears to have been cancelled.

A derivative of the Nomadik was created specifically for navigation systems (GPS), named Cartesio STA2062. This was used in products from Garmin such as the Nüvi 205 and Nüvi 500. This derivative used ARM926EJ-S, was coupled with the STA5620 GPS RF downconverter and added a 32-channel hardware GPS correlator.

The Nomadik family has been discontinued. In 2009, when development had already begun on a successor SoC called STn8500, it was superseded by the NovaThor family from ST-Ericsson and renamed U8500 as the ST-NXP Wireless division was merged into the ST-Ericsson joint venture.

References

External links 
 ST-Ericsson

ARM-based systems on chips